The 1921 Imperial Conference met in London from 20 June to 5 August 1921. It was chaired by British prime minister David Lloyd George.

The Prime Ministers of the United Kingdom and the Dominions met at the 1921 Imperial Conference to determine a unified international policy, particularly the relationship with the United States and the Empire of Japan. The most urgent issue was that of whether or not to renew the Anglo-Japanese Alliance, which was due to expire on 13 July 1921. On one side were the Prime Minister of Australia, Billy Hughes, and the Prime Minister of New Zealand, Bill Massey, who strongly favoured its renewal. Neither wanted their countries to be caught up in a war between the United States and Japan, and contrasted the generous assistance that Japan rendered during the First World War with the United States' disengagement from international affairs in its aftermath. "The British Empire", declared Hughes, "must have a reliable friend in the Pacific". They were opposed by the Prime Minister of Canada, Arthur Meighen, on the grounds that the alliance would adversely affect the relationship with the United States, which Canada depended upon for its security. As a result, no decision to renew was reached, and the alliance was allowed to expire.

This was the first Imperial Conference to which the colony of India was invited, though it was still a colony and not a dominion. However, it was primarily represented by the British cabinet minister responsible for the subcontinent.

Participants
The conference was hosted by King-Emperor George V, with his Prime Ministers and members of their respective cabinets:

See also
Imperial Conference

References

Sources

Citations

Bibliography
 
 

Imperial Conference
1921 in London
1921 in international relations
1921 in the British Empire
1921 conferences
1920s in the City of Westminster
June 1921 events
July 1921 events
August 1921 events
David Lloyd George
Winston Churchill
Jan Smuts